Jorge Soto (24 December 1921 – 24 December 1973) was a Puerto Rican weightlifter. He competed in the men's middle heavyweight event at the 1952 Summer Olympics.

References

1921 births
1973 deaths
Puerto Rican male weightlifters
Olympic weightlifters of Puerto Rico
Weightlifters at the 1952 Summer Olympics
Place of birth missing
20th-century Puerto Rican people